The Freedom Party of British Columbia was a minor political party in British Columbia, Canada. Several of its policies were based on fundamentalist Christian values.

The party was founded in April 2001 and it nominated two candidates in the 2001 British Columbia election: Kenneth Montgomery Keillor placed last in a field of four candidates in the riding of Abbotsford-Clayburn, winning 217 votes (1.25% of the total), and Robert Wayne McCulloch placed last in a field of 6 candidates in the riding of Abbotsford-Mt. Lehman, winning 23 votes (0.12% of the total).

It nominated two candidates in the 2005 election: Kenneth Montgomery Keillor placed fourth in a field of 5 candidates in Abbotsford-Clayburn, winning 192 votes (1.08%), and Jeremy Harold Sandwith Smyth placed last in a field of 6 candidates in Cowichan-Ladysmith, winning 79 votes (0.30%).

The party was de-registered by Elections BC in February 2009.

Election results

See also
 List of British Columbia political parties

Provincial political parties in British Columbia
Conservative parties in Canada
Abbotsford, British Columbia
2001 establishments in British Columbia
2009 disestablishments in British Columbia
Political parties established in 2001
Political parties disestablished in 2009